Andryala integrifolia, also known as common Andryala, is a species of flowering plant in the family Asteraceae.

References 

Cichorieae
Flora of Malta
Taxa named by Carl Linnaeus